Rod Laver was the defending singles champion at the Australian Indoor Tennis Championships but did not compete that year. First-seeded John Newcombe won in the final 6–4, 6–3, 6–4 against Cliff Richey. Richey threatened to quit the match after being called for a foot fault but eventually played on when the linesman was changed. The final was the best of 5 sets while all other rounds were the best of 3 sets.

Seeds

  John Newcombe (champion)
  Ken Rosewall (semifinals)
  Roscoe Tanner (quarterfinals)
  Dick Stockton (first round)
  Tony Roche (semifinals)
  Cliff Richey (final)
  Phil Dent (quarterfinals)
  Onny Parun (quarterfinals)

Draw

Top half

Bottom half

References

External links
 International Tennis Federation (ITF) – tournament edition details

Singles